Runrig was a six-piece folk rock band from Scotland. They sang about one quarter of their songs in Scottish Gaelic. Following is a list of these, by album.

Play Gaelic
Dùisg Mo Rùn
Sguaban Arbhair
Tillidh Mi
Griogal Cridhe
Nach Neònach Neisd A' Tha E
Sunndach
Air An Tràigh
Dè Nì Mi
An Ròs
Chì Mi'n Geamhradh
Cum 'Ur N'aire

The Highland Connection
Gamhna Gealla
Mairi
Fichead Bliadhna
Na H-uain A's T-earrach
Foghar Nan Eilean
Cearcal A' Chuain

Recovery
An Toll Dubh
Rubh Nan Cudaigean
'Ic Iain 'Ic Sheumais
Fuaim A' Bhlair
Tir An Airm

Heartland
O Cho Meallt
Air A' Chuan
Cnoc Na Feille
An Ataireachd Àrd

The Cutter And The Clan
Alba
An Ubhal As Airde

Searchlight
Tir A' Mhurain
Siol Ghoraidh

The Big Wheel
Abhainn An T-sluaigh
An Cuibhle Mòr

Amazing Things
Pòg Aon Oidhche Earraich
Sràidean Na Roinn-Eorpa
Àrd

Mara
Meadhan Oidhche Air An Acairseid
Thairis Air A' Ghleann

In Search Of Angels
Ribhinn Donn
Da Mhile Bliadhna
A' Dh'innse Na Firinn
Cho Buidhe Is A' Bha I Riabh

The Stamping Ground
An Sabhal Aig Niall
Oran Ailein
Oran

Proterra
An Toll Dubh
Faileas Air An Airigh
A' Reiteach

Everything You See
An Dealachadh
Sona

The Story
Onar
An-Diugh Ghabh Mi Cuairt

Lists of songs